Anō Station is the name of three train stations in Japan:

 Anō Station (Fukuoka) (穴生駅)
 Anō Station (Shiga)  (穴太駅)
 Anoh Station (Mie)  (穴太駅)